Proechiniscus hanneae is a species of tardigrade. It is the only species of Proechiniscus, a genus within the family Echiniscidae.

The species is endemic to Greenland, where they occur on Disko Island.

The species was first described as Pseudechiniscus hanneae by Børge Petersen in 1951. It was placed in the new genus of Proechinscus  by Reinhardt Møbjerg Kristensen in 1987.

References

Further reading
Kristensen, 1987 : Generic revision of the Echiniscidae (Heterotardigrada), with a discussion of the origin of the family. Collana U.Z.I. Selected Symposia and Monographs, no. 1, p. 261-335.
Petersen (1951), ''The Tardigrade fauna of Greenland. A faunistic study with some few ecological remarks.;; Meddelelser om Gronland, vol. 150, no. 5, p. 1-94.

Echiniscidae
Invertebrates of Greenland
Animals described in 1951